Dixon Creek may refer to:

Places
Dixons Creek, Victoria, a town in Victoria, Australia
Dixon Lane-Meadow Creek, California, a census-designated place in Inyo County, California
Dixon Creek Ranch, former name of part of the 6666 Ranch in Texas

River
Dixon Creek (creek), a creek in Texas